CUSAT is the Cochin University of Science and Technology, a university in India.

CUSAT may also refer to:

Cornell University Satellite, a satellite project team from Cornell University

See also 
 True quantified Boolean formula, also known as QSAT
 Kusat, a village in Oman